Senator Rich may refer to:

John Treadway Rich (1841–1926), Michigan State Senate
Joseph C. Rich (1841–1908), Idaho State Senate
Nan Rich (born 1942), Florida State Senate

See also
William G. Ritch (1830–1904), Wisconsin State Senate